Rod Morgenstein (born April 19, 1953) is an American drummer, best known for his work with the  rock bands Winger and Dixie Dregs.

He also played with Fiona, Platypus, the Steve Morse Band, and Jelly Jam.  He has also done session work with Jordan Rudess including his ventures with the Rudess/Morgenstein Project.  He also toured with Jazz Is Dead.  He has also been awarded Modern Drummers "Best Progressive Rock Drummer" five years (1986-'90), "Best All-Around Drummer" (1999) and was inducted into magazine's Honor Roll.

He worked for twenty years as a professor, teaching percussion at Berklee College of Music in Boston, Massachusetts.  Morgenstein continues to tour with the band Winger. He has also been a columnist for Modern Drummer magazine.

Morgenstein is known for his versatility of playing many styles of music.

Equipment
Morgenstein currently uses Premier drums, Evans Drumheads, Sabian cymbals, Vic Firth drumsticks, and LP Percussion.  He has, in the past, also used Remo drumheads and Paiste cymbals.

Drums: Premier signia series (also uses the genista series): 
 22"x18" bass drums (x2) 
 10"x9" rack tom 
 12"x10" rack tom 
 13"x11" rack tom 
 16"x16" floor tom 
 18"x16" floor tom 
 14"x6.5" snare 
 14"x14" piccolo snare

Drumheads: Evans: 
 Snare: G1 Coated or Power Center Reverse Dot/300 Snare Side 
 Toms: EC2S Clear or G1 Clear (top and resonant) 
 Bass: EQ4 Clear/EQ3 Black Bass Reso

Drumsticks: Vic Firth: 
 Vic Firth Rod Morgenstein signature drumsticks (Length 16.12", Diameter: .610") 
- described as essentially combining a 5B and 2B stick

Cymbals: Sabian: 
 AA regular hi-hats 13" 
 HH china kang 10"/AA splash 10" (stacked) 
 AA splash 12" 
 AA splash 10" 
 AA splash 8" 
 AAX stage crash 18"/cymbal disc 12" (stacked) 
 AAX stage crash 16" (or studio crash) 
 AA splash 10" 
 Signature tri-top ride 21" 
 HH china 20" 
 HH thin crash 18"

Paiste cymbals (circa 1984): 
 RUDE 14" hi-hats 
 Formula 602 11" splash 
 RUDE 16" crash/ride 
 RUDE 18" crash/ride 
 2002 18" medium 
 RUDE 20" ride/crash 
 Formula 602 22" heavy 
 2002 20" china type 
 Sound Creation 22" dark china

Cymbals circa 1988: 
 3000 14" sound edge hi-hats 
 Formula 602 11" splash 
 3000 17" thin crash 
 3000 18" thin crash 
 3000 19" thin crash 
 RUDE 22" ride/crash 
 Sound Creation 20" dark china

Discography

with Dixie Dregs
The Great Spectacular  (1976)
Free Fall  (1977)
What If  (1978)
Night of the Living Dregs  (1979)
Dregs of the Earth  (1980)
Unsung Heroes  (1981)
Industry Standard  (1982)
Full Circle  (1994)

with The Steve Morse Band
The Introduction (1984)
Stand Up (1985)
High Tension Wires (1989)

with Winger
Winger (1988)
In the Heart of the Young (1990)
Pull (1993)
IV (2006)
Karma (2009)
Better Days Comin' (2014)

with Fiona
Heart Like a Gun (1989)

with Rudess/Morgenstein Project
Rudess/Morgenstein Project (1997)
The Official Bootleg (2001)

with Platypus
When Pus Comes to Shove (1998)
Ice Cycles (2000)

with The Jelly Jam
 The Jelly Jam (2002)
 The Jelly Jam 2 (2004)
 Shall We Descend (2011)
 Profit (2016)

with Jazz Is Dead
 Laughing Water (1999)
 Great Sky River (2001)
 Grateful Jazz (2015)

References

External links

 
 Berklee College of Music profile

Jazz fusion drummers
American rock drummers
Winger (band) members
Dixie Dregs members
Berklee College of Music faculty
Living people
1953 births
Progressive rock drummers
Progressive metal musicians
20th-century American drummers
American male drummers
The Jelly Jam members
American male jazz musicians
Jazz Is Dead members